The 1963 NSWRFL season was the 56th season of the New South Wales Rugby Football League premiership based in Sydney. Ten teams from across the city competed for the J J Giltinan Shield and WD & HO Wills Cup during the season, which culminated in a replay of the previous two years' grand finals between St. George and Western Suburbs.

Teams

Ladder

Finals

Grand Final

The crowd of 69,806 who turned out for the grand final was a record. From the opening whistle the 1963 decider was a gruelling affair. Heavy rain meant that the wet SCG pitch quickly became a quagmire and players unrecognisable. At one point, St George five-eighth, Bruce Pollard was blinded by the mud such that he couldn't pass or catch the ball so he swapped places with Johnny Raper and played out the second half at lock. Raper also set up the best movement of the match when he broke the line and found Reg Gasnier in support. Gasnier, with a Wests defender hanging off him, sent the ball to Norm Provan who in turn found Johnny King. However the Magpies defence held and no try was scored.

Saints conceded their first grand final try since 1958 when Wests centre Gil McDougall scored. As the match developed, it was clear that Wests had a game plan which involved a focus of intimidation on Gasnier. McDougall and other Magpies punched, stiff armed and kneed Gasnier at every opportunity. He was consequently subdued throughout the game.

The game was ultimately the Dragons' most controversial win in their 11-year run since the story has passed into Australian rugby league folklore that St George benefitted from dubious decisions made by referee Darcy Lawler.

Lawler, the game's No.1 referee was known to enjoy a bet. A number of Wests players and sports journalists have claimed that the '63 Grand Final was a rout and point to some questionable decisions with Wests captain Arthur Summons claiming that before the game one of his team mates (later revealed to be Jack Gibson) entered the change room and told others that if they had backed themselves to win they had better lay off their bets because "The ref has backed St George". Just before half time, Wests had a try disallowed. At 8-3 McDougall had a chance to even the score when he won a race to the ball in goal, but Lawler ruled that he did not ground it. Later with 15 minutes to go and the score favouring Saints 5-3, Johnny King scored a controversial match winning try. Both decisions fuelled the debate about Lawler's impartiality on the day. Lawler, who awarded St George the penalties 18-7, retired after the match.

Newcomer Graeme Langlands passed to King who raced down his muddy wing after fending off his opposite John Mowbray. King appeared to be claimed by the cover defence of Don Parish but both players tumbled and in the slimy conditions King was not clearly held. He got up and was bowled over again but still not held and with no marker he ran towards the corner past a relaxed defence who believed he had been tackled. If ever there was an example of playing to the whistle, this was it. Johnny King scored one of the most debated tries in Australian Grand Final history. King claims that he was told by the referee to 'play on' while Wests legend, Noel Kelly claims that King was tackled and that Wests 'were robbed'. Behind the try line as the conversion was being lined up Chow Hayes yelled at Lawler "you're a cheat". Lawler said "Say that again and I will send you off". Jack Gibson said "send him off and I will rearrange your face on Monday". Lawler blushed and throughout the conversion Hayes continued to chant "you're a cheat".

But for the record books, St George won their eighth consecutive Grand Final, defeating a gallant Wests team, 8-3 and destroying Wests' hopes for the third year running. It was the final time that Western Suburbs would appear in a Grand Final. Also, St George won the premiership that year in all three grades.

The match is also celebrated in Australian rugby league history as a result of John O'Gready's enduring photo of rival captains Provan and Summons in a congratulatory mud-caked embrace at game's end. The award winning photo became known as "the Gladiators" and since it was first published has been appreciated by rugby league fans as capturing an essence of the game wherein a little man can fairly compete against the bigger man, and where sporting respect and camaraderie follow epic struggle. Since 1982 a bronze replica of the Provan and Summons embrace has adorned the various incarnations of the Australian rugby league premiership trophy.

 St. George 8 (Tries: Evans, King. Goals: Gasnier 1.)

Western Suburbs 3 ( Tries: McDougall.)

Player statistics
The following statistics are as of the conclusion of Round 18.

Top 5 point scorers

Top 5 try scorers

Top 5 goal scorers

References

External links
 Rugby League Tables - Season 1963 The World of Rugby League
 Writer, Larry (1995) Never Before, Never Again, Pan MacMillan, Sydney
Results: 1961-70 at rabbitohs.com.au
1963 J J Giltinan Shield and WD HO Wills Cup at rleague.com
NSWRFL season 1963 at rugbyleagueproject.org
St. George 1963 season at showroom.com.au

New South Wales Rugby League premiership
Nswrfl Season